Calling Australia was a 1943 Japanese short film, by directed by Dr. Huyung (formerly known as Hinatsu Eitaro, Hae Yeong, and Hŏ Yŏng).

History 
The film was made by the Imperial Japanese Army Secret Service and Australian servicemen, and served as propaganda to train the Australian public to accept occupation of their country by the Japanese military. The film depicts Australian prisoners of war (POWs) in Java, Indonesia who are drinking beer, playing sports, eating balanced meals; and culminates in a stage show by the POWs, some performing in drag. 

The Allies responded with the film produced by the Australian Army, Nippon Presents (1945). An invasion of Australia by Japan never happened and the film had been forgotten and lost, only to be rediscovered in 1969. However there are conflicting reports on who found the film.

Prisoners of Propaganda (1987) is an Australian documentary film about the making of Calling Australia, directed by Graham Shirley.

See also
Indonesia Calling
Cinema of Indonesia
List of documentary films about World War II
Union Films
Netherlands Indies Government Information Service
South Pacific Film Corporation

References

1943 films
Documentary films about World War II
1940s English-language films
Japanese short documentary films
Japanese World War II propaganda films